The Mt. Pleasant Presbyterian Church, known as Christian Church at Mt. Pleasant or Mt. Pleasant Community Church, was built in 1856 near Stayton, Oregon.  It was listed on the National Register of Historic Places in 1974 for its architecture.

It was built on land donated by Washington Crabtree.  The church was subject of some conflict between two groups that used the church:In its early years, the church served alternately as a meeting place for the Cumberland Presbyterian and Christian groups. Benjamin Franklin Irvine belonged to the former sect and Crabtree to the latter. The church's denomination depended upon which of the men secured the minister. Services also were held in the buiLding whenever a circuit rider or evangelist traveled through the neighborhood. At one time a division between the "sprinkling" and "total immersion" groups became so heated that Crabtree, on whose land the building stood, is reported to have kept the church filled with hay for two years. A reconciliation was finally reached and the church reopened.

References

National Register of Historic Places in Linn County, Oregon
Churches completed in 1856
19th-century Presbyterian church buildings in the United States
Presbyterian churches in Oregon
Buildings and structures in Linn County, Oregon
1856 establishments in Oregon Territory